Philippe François Zéphyrin Guillemin (March 16, 1814 - April 5, 1886) was a Roman Catholic bishop.

He was born in Vuillafans, Doubs, France.

He was appointed titular bishop of Cybistra in 1856 and was ordained bishop in 1857.

He was the first vicar apostolic of Guangdong from November 16, 1853, to April 5, 1886.

He oversaw the construction project of the Sacred Heart Cathedral of Guangzhou, although he did not see its completion, since he died two years before.

He died in Besançon.

Works

Further reading
 

1814 births
1886 deaths
Paris Foreign Missions Society missionaries
19th-century French Roman Catholic bishops